Olaf Pollack (born 20 September 1973) is a German former professional track and road racing cyclist specializing in sprint races and competitions.

Track race
At the 2000 Olympic Games, Pollack entered the team pursuit and the madison. Pollack rode in the qualifying rounds for the team pursuit, but was not used in the German team that rode the final and won; Pollack still received a golden medal. For winning the gold medal at the Olympic Games 2000 Pollack was decorated with the Silver Laurel Leaf by Bundespräsident Johannes Rau (President of the Federal Republic of Germany) on 2 February 2001
At the madison, Pollack rode together with Guido Fulst, and finished in sixth place.

Pollack returned to the track in 2008, when he rode at the 2008 UCI Track Cycling World Championships, and finished in second place in the madison. At the 2008 Olympic Games, Pollack rode the madison together with Roger Kluge, and they finished fifth.

Road race
Olaf Pollack began his road cycling career at small German team Agro-Adler-Brandenburg in 1997. After 3 years he left for Team Gerolsteiner. In 2005 and 2006 he rode for T-Mobile, leaving in 2007 for Team Wiesenhof. The highlight of his road cycling career was wearing the pink jersey as leader of the general classification at the 2004 and 2006 Giro d'Italia.

In August 2009, an eye problem made him end his cycling career, but a month later it became known that he had failed a drug test. In 2009 he was suspended by the German Cycling Federation.

Major results

1990
 2nd, World Championship, Track, Team Pursuit, Juniors, Middlesbrough
1991
 2nd, World Championship, Track, Team Pursuit, Juniors
1997 – Agro Adler
 1st, 1 stage — Niedersachsen Rundfahrt
 1st, 1 stage — Clásico RCN
1998 – Agro-Adler-Brandenburg
 1st, 2 stages — Tour of Slovenia
 1st, 2 stages — Olympia's Ronde
1999 – Agro-Adler-Brandenburg
 1st, 1 stage — Peace Race
 1st, 1 stage — Tour of Chile
 2nd, Rund um Berlin
 2nd, National Championship, Track, Team Pursuit, Elite
 2nd, National Championship, Road, ITT, Elite
 3rd, World Championship, Track, Madison, Elite, Berlin
 3rd, General Classification, Niedersachsen Rundfahrt
 1st, 1 stage 
2000 – Team Gerolsteiner
 1st, 2 stages — Rapport-Toer
 1st, 1 stage — Tour of Tasmania
 1st, National Championship, Track, Madison, Elite
 2nd, Six Days, Berlin
2001 – Team Gerolsteiner
 1st, 2 stages — Niedersachsen Rundfahrt
 1st — Rund um die Nürnberger Altstadt
2002 – Team Gerolsteiner
 1st overall — Groningen–Münster
 1st, General Classification — Niedersachsen Rundfahrt
 1st, Stage 2 and Stage 3
 1st, Stages 1, 2, 3 — Peace Race
 1st, Points Classification — Danmark Rundt
 1st, Stage 5 
 1st, Groningen-Münster
 1st, Stage 1 — Hessen-Rundfahrt
 2nd, Rund um die Nürnberger Altstadt
 2nd, Paris–Brussels
 3rd, General Classification Driedaagse van West-Vlaanderen
 3rd, Criterium, Bad Salgau
2003 – Team Gerolsteiner
 1st, Points Classification — Bayern Rundfahrt
 1st, Stage 5 — Niedersachsen Rundfahrt
 1st, Stage 7 — Deutschland Tour
 2nd, Krefeld–Rund um die Sparkasse
 2nd, General Classification Tour of Qatar
 2nd, Groningen–Münster
2004 – Team Gerolsteiner
 1st, Stage 2 — Sachsen-Tour
 1st (after Stage 1), general classification — Giro d'Italia
 112th, General Classification
 2nd, Criterium, Radevormwald
2005 – T-Mobile Team
2006 – T-Mobile Team
 Giro d'Italia
 3rd, points classification
 132nd, General Classification
 Tour of California
 1st, Stages 6 & 7
 1st, Points Classification (Green jersey)
 1st, Stage 1 Cologne Classic
 1st, Stage 4 Post Danmark Rundt
 2nd, Criterium, Radevormwald
2007 – Team Wiesenhof–Felt
 1st, Stage 1, Critérium International
 1st, Rheda–Wiedenbrück
 1st, Dahme Trophy
 2nd, Derny Cup, Griessen
 2nd, National Championship, Track, Pursuit, Elite, Germany, Berlin
 2nd, National Championship, Track, Team Pursuit, Elite, Germany, Berlin
 2nd, National Championship, Track, Madison, Elite, Germany, Berlin
 2nd, Rund um die Nürnberger Altstadt, Nürnberg
 3rd, Six Days, Stuttgart
2008
 3rd, World Cup, Track, Madison, Los Angeles

References

External links

1973 births
Living people
People from Bautzen (district)
People from Bezirk Dresden
German male cyclists
German track cyclists
Cyclists from Saxony
Olympic cyclists of Germany
Cyclists at the 2000 Summer Olympics
Recipients of the Silver Laurel Leaf
Cyclists at the 2008 Summer Olympics
Doping cases in cycling
German sportspeople in doping cases
Olympic gold medalists for Germany
Olympic medalists in cycling
Medalists at the 2000 Summer Olympics